This is an overview of the progression of the Paralympic track cycling record of the men's 4000m pursuitl as recognised by the Union Cycliste Internationale (UCI) and IPC.

C5 Progression

C4 Progression

B Progression

References

Track cycling Olympic record progressions